Capital punishment is a legal penalty in the Maldives, but the last execution was in 1952, when the country was a British colony.

The only legal method of execution is lethal injection, although hanging has been proposed. Crimes punishable by death include murder, adultery, apostasy, terrorism, and treason - however the punishment is not mandatory for any crime. Capital punishment is a legal punishment for defendants over seven years old.

Currently, it is believed that there are about 17-20 individuals under a sentence of death in the Maldives, 13 of which were sentenced in 2013.

In 2016, convicted murderer Hussain Humaam Ahmed was scheduled to be executed by lethal injection in the Maldives, but the execution was postponed following international calls for clemency. In late July, 2017, another execution date was scheduled for Ahmed, and the Maldives stated that they intended to carry out his execution and the executions of two others in September 2017. For unknown reasons, the executions were not carried out. A Maldives government spokesperson stated the delays in executions would be resolved by 8 October 2017. Again, however, the date passed with no executions being carried out.

The Maldives voted against the United Nations moratorium on the death penalty in 2007 and 2008, then voted in favour of the moratorium in 2010, then abstained from voting in 2012 and 2014, and then voted against it again in 2016, 2018, and 2020.

References

Maldives
Human rights abuses in the Maldives